Daniel Chugerman (August 8, 1912 – November 21, 1991), known professionally as Daniel Mann, was an American stage, film and television director.

Originally trained as an actor by Sanford Meisner, between 1952 and 1987 he directed over 31 feature films and made-for-television. Considered a true "actor's director", he helmed seven Oscar-nominated and two Tony Award-winning performances, collaborating with actors like Burt Lancaster, Shirley Booth, Susan Hayward, Marlon Brando, Elizabeth Taylor, Dean Martin and Anthony Quinn.

He was nominated for several accolades, including two Palme d'Or, three Directors Guild of America Awards and a Golden Bear.

Biography
Mann was born in Brooklyn, New York, the son of Helen and Samuel Chugerman, a lawyer. He was a stage actor since childhood and attended Erasmus Hall High School, New York's Professional Children's School and the Neighborhood Playhouse. He entered films in 1952 as a director and is known for his excellent ear for dialogue. Most of Mann's films were adaptations from the stage (Come Back Little Sheba, The Rose Tattoo, The Teahouse of the August Moon, Hot Spell) and literature (Butterfield 8, The Last Angry Man).

Mann died of heart failure in Los Angeles, California, in November 1991. He is buried in the Jewish Cemetery Hillside Memorial Park. He had three children with his wife, actress Mary Kathleen Williams: Michael Mann, Erica Mann Ramis and Alex Mann. His daughter is the widow of director Harold Ramis.

Filmography as director

Select theatre credits
The Immoralist (1954)

Awards
Nominee Grand Prize of Festival, Come Back, Little Sheba - Cannes Film Festival (1952)
Winner International Prize, Come Back, Little Sheba - Cannes Film Festival (1952)
Nominee Best Director, Come Back, Little Sheba - Directors Guild of America (1952)
Nominee Palme d'Or, I'll Cry Tomorrow - Cannes Film Festival (1955)
Nominee Best Director, The Rose Tattoo - Directors Guild of America (1955)
Nominee Best Director, The Teahouse of the August Moon - 'Directors Guild of America (1956)
Nominee Golden Bear, The Teahouse of the August Moon - Berlin International Film Festival (1956)

References

External links

Daniel Mann papers, Margaret Herrick Library, Academy of Motion Picture Arts and Sciences

1912 births
1991 deaths
20th-century American Jews
Burials at Hillside Memorial Park Cemetery
Donaldson Award winners
People from Brooklyn
Film directors from New York City
Erasmus Hall High School alumni